Dichomeris anisospila is a moth of the family Gelechiidae. It was described by Edward Meyrick in 1934. It is known from Guangdong province in China.

References

anisospila
Moths described in 1934